There are two sporting events named the Barcelona Open:
Barcelona Open (golf)
Barcelona Open (tennis)